Putting One Over is a lost 1919 silent film drama directed by Edward Dillon and starring George Walsh. It was produced and directed by Fox Film Corporation.

Cast
George Walsh - Horace Barney/Jack Trevor
Edith Stockton - Helen Townsend
Ralph J. Locke - Maurice Claypool
Frank Beamish - Thomas Farrel
Robert Lee Kealing - Dr. John Wallace
Matthew Betz - Giles
John T. Dillon - Dobbs
Elizabeth Garrison - Mrs. Townsend
Marcia Harris - Mrs. Eleanor Davies
Henry Hallam - Johnny Thomkins

References

External links
 Putting One Over at IMDb.com

1919 films
American silent feature films
Lost American films
Films directed by Edward Dillon
American black-and-white films
Fox Film films
Silent American drama films
1919 drama films
1919 lost films
Lost drama films
1910s American films